Haliotis planata, common name the planate abalone, is a species of sea snail, a marine gastropod mollusk in the family Haliotidae, the abalones.

Description
The size of the shell varies between 20 mm and 40 mm. "The very flat, solid shell has an oval shape. The spire is not at all raised. The distance of the apex from the nearest margin is about one-sixth the length of the shell. The surface is sculptured with numerous uneven spiral cords. The outline is oval. It is very much depressed, flatter than any other haliotid species. Outside it is chocolate brown stained in places with green, having oblique, branching streaks of cream-white, or blotches of the same tint. The sculpture consists of numerous spiral cords separated by deep grooves. The cords are more or less nodose from the intersection of uneven radiating folds, often obscure. Toward the lower end, outside of the row of holes, the cords are obviously scaly or granose. Spire plane, generally eroded and white. The inner surface is silvery, iridescent, and spirally grooved. The columellar plate is very wide above, flat, not quite covering the small spire-cavity. The open perforations number four to five. They are small, oval, their edges a trifle raised."

Distribution
This marine species occurs from the Eastern Indian to western Pacific, from Sri Lanka, the Andaman Islands and Nicobar Islands to Fiji; and off Western Australia.

References

 Sowerby, G.B. (2nd) 1882. Thesaurus Conchyliorum. Vol. 5 pp. 1–54
 Springsteen, F.J. & Leobrera, F.M. 1986. Shells of the Philippines. Manila : Carfel Seashell Museum 377 pp., 100 pls
 Wilson, B. 1993. Australian Marine Shells. Prosobranch Gastropods. Kallaroo, Western Australia : Odyssey Publishing Vol. 1 408 pp.
 Geiger, D.L. 2000 [1999]. Distribution and biogeography of the recent Haliotidae (Gastropoda: Vetigastropoda) world-wide. Bollettino Malacologico 35(5-12): 57–120
 Geiger D.L. & Poppe G.T. (2000). A Conchological Iconography: The family Haliotidae. Conchbooks, Hackenheim Germany. 135pp 83pls.
 Petit R.E. (2009) George Brettingham Sowerby, I, II & III: their conchological publications and molluscan taxa. Zootaxa 2189: 1–218
 Geiger D.L. & Owen B. (2012) Abalone: Worldwide Haliotidae. Hackenheim: Conchbooks. viii + 361 pp. page(s): 109

External links
 

planata
Gastropods described in 1882